Sheleverci is a village in Municipality of Prilep. It used to be part of the former municipality of Topolčani.

Demographics
According to the 2002 census, the village had a total of 21 inhabitants. Ethnic groups in the village include:

Macedonians 21

References

Villages in Prilep Municipality
Villages in North Macedonia